Bident Mountain is a  summit in Banff National Park, Alberta, Canada.  With only  prominence, Bident Mountain together with Quadra Mountain form an imposing wall in the Canadian Rockies and act as subpeaks of Mount Fay.  Bident was first climbed in 1903 by Charles Thompson and Hans Kaufmann.

Bident Mountain has the shape of a bident, hence the name.

Bident Mountain forms the west buttress of Consolation Pass with  Mount Bell forming the east buttress. These two peaks rise above the head of Consolation Valley.

Geology

Like other mountains in Banff Park, Bident Mountain is composed of sedimentary rock laid down during the Precambrian to Jurassic periods. Formed in shallow seas, this sedimentary rock was pushed east and over the top of younger rock during the Laramide orogeny.

Climate

Based on the Köppen climate classification, Bident Mountain is located in a subarctic climate zone with cold, snowy winters, and mild summers. Winter temperatures can drop below -20 °C with wind chill factors below -30 °C.

References

External links

 Parks Canada web site: Banff National Park

Three-thousanders of Alberta
Mountains of Banff National Park